The Birmingham gauge is a wire gauge system, and is also used to specify thickness or diameter of hypodermic needles and tube products.

Terminology 
Birmingham gauge is also known as the Stubs Iron Wire Gauge or Birmingham Wire Gauge. It is not the same as, though similar to, the Stubs Steel Wire Gauge.

Birmingham gauge is often simply termed Gauge, with the abbreviation G. However, this should not be confused with French gauge.

System 
Concerning wire and fine tubing, the gauge number is used to specify the outside diameter of the product, whereas for larger mechanical tubing the gauge number specifies the wall thickness independent of the overall size of the tube.

In medicine, the Birmingham gauge specifies the outside diameter of hypodermic needles, catheters, cannulae and suture wires. It was originally developed in early 19th-century England for use in wire manufacture, and began appearing in a medical setting in the early 20th century.

Another common needle gauge system is the French catheter scale.

Needle wire gauge was derived from the Stubs Iron Wire Gauge.

Sizes of hypodermic needles 

Hypodermic needles are available in a wide variety of outer diameters described by gauge numbers. Smaller gauge numbers indicate larger outer diameters. Inner diameter depends on both gauge and wall thickness. The following chart shows nominal inner diameter and wall thickness for regular-wall needles. Thin-wall needles (not shown) have identical outer diameters but larger inner diameters for a given gauge.

Rapid blood transfusion through 23G or smaller needles can cause hemolysis (rupturing of red blood cells).

Sizes of catheters 
This includes peripheral venous catheters and central venous catheters. The gauge compared to outer diameter is the same as for needles, but the color coding is different.

See also 
Wire gauge, including other systems
French gauge, mainly for catheters
American Wire Gauge

References

Further reading 
 ISO 9626: Stainless steel needle tubing for the manufacture of medical devices, 1st ed. Geneva: International Organization for Standardization, 1991: 1–2.
 ISO 9626: Stainless steel needle tubing for the manufacture of medical devices, Amendment 1. Geneva: International Organization for Standardization, 2001: 1–2.

External links 

 Sheet Metal Gauge Size Data – Engineers Edge

Wire gauges
Standards of the United Kingdom